Calamia is a genus of moths of the family Noctuidae.

Species
 Calamia deliciosa Boursin, 1957
 Calamia flavirufa Hampson, 1910
 Calamia metamorpha (Boursin, 1960)
 Calamia staudingeri Warnecke, 1941
 Calamia tridens (Hufnagel, 1766) – Burren green

References

External links
 Natural History Museum Lepidoptera genus database

Hadeninae